Krajnik Górny  (German: Hohenkränig) is a village in the administrative district of Gmina Chojna, within Gryfino County, West Pomeranian Voivodeship, in north-western Poland, close to the German border.

As of 2011, it had a population of 151.

References

Villages in Gryfino County